Mohamed Elkhedr (born 22 February 1988 in Atbarah, Sudan)  is a Sudanese Olympic swimmer. He represented Sudan at the 2012 Summer Olympics in the Men's 50 metre freestyle event where he was ranked 50th with a time of 27.26 seconds.

References 

1988 births
Living people
Sudanese male freestyle swimmers
Olympic swimmers of Sudan
Swimmers at the 2012 Summer Olympics
20th-century Sudanese people
21st-century Sudanese people